Hungarian music may refer to:

Music of Hungary, which includes many kinds of music associated with Serbian, Roma and ethnically Hungarian people
Hungarian folk music, which is found in Hungary as well as parts of Serbia, Slovakia and Romania